The Chateaubriand Bridge is a concrete deck arch road bridge in Brittany, France, that crosses the Rance river. For geographical conditions and technical traditions, France does not have many arch bridges.

History

Design
The need for a bridge was envisaged by SETRA (Service d'études sur les transports, les routes et leurs aménagements).

Construction
It had a cantilever construction with cable-stays (staying wires). The steel construction was by Compagnie Française d'Entreprises Métalliques, now owned by Eiffage. It was built with high performance Class C60 concrete.

Structure
The bridge carries the European route E401 or Route nationale 176. It is near Plouër-sur-Rance and La Ville-ès-Nonais. The bridge spans the two departments of Ille-et-Vilaine, to the east, and Côtes-d'Armor, to the west.

See also
 List of bridges in France
 List of longest arch bridge spans
 Morbihan Bridge at La Roche-Bernard, similar design, opened 1996

References

External links
 Structurae

Arch bridges in France
Bridges completed in 1991
Buildings and structures in Côtes-d'Armor
Buildings and structures in Ille-et-Vilaine
Concrete bridges in France
Open-spandrel deck arch bridges
François-René de Chateaubriand